Pouébo  is a commune in the North Province of New Caledonia, an overseas territory of France in the Pacific Ocean.

Geography

Climate
Pouébo has a tropical monsoon climate (Köppen climate classification Am).

References

Communes of New Caledonia